Naked and Famous may refer to:

"Naked and Famous" (song), by The Presidents of the United States of America (1994)
Naked and Famous (cocktail), IBA official cocktail
The Naked and Famous, indie rock band